Bolden is a given name and surname. Notable people with the name include:

Given name
Bolden Brace (born 1997), American basketball player
Bolden Reush Harrison (1886–1952), U.S. Navy seaman

Surname
Bess Bolden Walcott (1886-1988), African American educator, librarian, curator and activist 
Brandon Bolden (born 1990), American football player 
Bruce Bolden (born 1966), American former basketball player in Australia
Bubba Bolden (born 2000), American football player
Buddy Bolden (1877–1931), American jazz musician
Charles Bolden (born 1946), American pilot, astronaut, and NASA Administrator
Elizabeth Bolden (1890–2006), American supercentenarian
Jonah Bolden (born 1996), Australian basketball player
Kyra Harris Bolden (born 1988), American politician
Marques Bolden (born 1998), American-born Indonesian basketball
Omar Bolden (born 1988), American football player
Slade Bolden (born 1999), American football player
Tonya Bolden (born 1959), American author

See also
Boldin, a surname
Bodin (surname)